, also known as the "Kumazawa emperor", was a Japanese businessman and Buddhist priest from Nagoya who publicly disputed the legitimacy of Emperor Hirohito's bloodline in the period shortly after the end of the Second World War. He claimed to be the 19th direct descendant of Emperor Go-Kameyama.

In 1946–1947, Hiromichi was only the first of roughly nineteen men who put themselves forward as Japan's rightful Emperor. As a direct descendant of the Southern Court emperors of the Nanboku-chō period, he argued that Emperor Hirohito was illegitimate. He pointed out that Hirohito's entire line is descended from the Northern Court emperors. He produced a koseki detailing his bloodline back to Emperor Go-Daigo in Yoshino, but his claims and rhetoric failed to inspire anything other than sympathy.

Hiromichi's claims ultimately remained unsubstantiated.

Notes

References
 Bix, Herbert P. (2000). Hirohito and the Making of Modern Japan. New York: HarperCollins. ; 
 Dower, John W. (1999). Embracing Defeat: Japan in the Wake of World War II. New York: W. W. Norton. ; 
 Lauterbach, Richard E.  "The True Emperor of Japan," Life (January 21, 1946). Vol. 20, No. 3, p. 33.
 Maga, Timothy P. (2000). Judgment at Tokyo : the Japanese War Crime Trials. Lexington, Kentucky: University Press of Kentucky. ; 

Occupied Japan
1889 births
1966 deaths
Pretenders
People from Aichi Prefecture